Civic Square may refer to:

 Civic Square, Canberra, Australia
 Civic Square, Wellington, New Zealand
 Seattle Civic Square, United States
 Civic Square (Hong Kong), on Tim Mei Avenue